Pablo Cuevas and Marcel Granollers were the defending champions; however, Granollers chose to not compete.
Cuevas partnered up with Michael Russell, but they were eliminated by Jérémy Chardy and Lukáš Dlouhý in the quarterfinal.

Igor Kunitsyn and Dmitry Tursunov, which received wildcards into the doubles draw, won this event. They defeated Janko Tipsarević and Viktor Troicki 7–6(10–8), 6–3 in the final.

Seeds

Draw

Draw

External links
 Main Draw

Kremlin Cup - Men's Doubles
Kremlin Cup